Plantsville is a neighborhood in the town of Southington, Hartford County, Connecticut. It is centered at the merger between South Main Street (road from the Milldale section) and West Main Street (road from the Marion section). As of the 2000 Census there were 10,387 people living in the Zip Code Tabulation Area for zip code 06479, which is assigned the postal city name Plantsville. The Zip Code Tabulation Area includes the entire southwestern corner of the town of Southington, including Marion and Milldale. Beginning in 2015 Plantsville (not including Marion and Milldale) was listed as a census-designated place.

Geography
Plantsville is located in the south-central part of Southington at geographical coordinates 41° 34′ 56" North, 72° 53′ 25" West (41.5824, -72.8904). It is just south of the town center of Southington. The CDP border follows Prospect Street and Carter Lane on the north side, Old Turnpike Road on the east, Mulberry Street on the south, and Atwater Street and Interstate 84 on the west. Connecticut Route 10 (Main Street) passes through the center of Plantsville, leading north to the center of Southington and south to Cheshire.

The Quinnipiac River flows through the community, just west of Route 10.

1962 Tornado
On May 24, 1962, the neighborhood was partially flattened by a high-end F3 tornado. The tornado, which was "near-F4" intensity at the time, damaged or destroyed numerous buildings, homes, businesses, and vehicles throughout the area. Overall, the storm left one dead and 50 injured.

Demographics
At the time of the 2000 Census there was a total of 10,387 people living within the Plantsville Zip Code Tabulation Area. The Median Age was 38.3. The median home value in Plantsville is $255,500.

Attractions 
The Plantsville Historic District is a historic district that was listed on the National Register of Historic Places in 1988. The district was recognized for its diversity of 19th and early 20th-century residential and industrial architecture, encompassing a century's development of the community as an industrial village.  Notable buildings include the 1866 Plantsville Congregational Church, one of the state's finest examples of Gothic Revival architecture, designed by Josiah Cleveland Cady.

Education 
There are three schools located in Plantsville: Plantsville School, Strong Elementary School, and John F. Kennedy Middle School.

See also

National Register of Historic Places listings in Southington, Connecticut

References

External links
 Town of Southington (official site)

Southington, Connecticut
Neighborhoods in Connecticut
Census-designated places in Hartford County, Connecticut
Census-designated places in Connecticut
Queen Anne architecture in Connecticut
Italianate architecture in Connecticut
Historic districts in Hartford County, Connecticut
National Register of Historic Places in Hartford County, Connecticut
Historic districts on the National Register of Historic Places in Connecticut